The 1998 Internazionali Femminili di Palermo was a women's tennis tournament played on outdoor clay courts in Palermo, Italy that was part of the Tier IV category of the 1998 WTA Tour. It was the 11th edition of the tournament and was held from 13 July until 19 July 1998. First-seeded Patty Schnyder won the singles title and earned $17,700 first-prize money.

Finals

Singles

 Patty Schnyder defeated  Barbara Schett 6–1, 5–7, 6–2
 It was Schnyder's 5th singles title of the year and the 5th of her career.

Doubles

 Pavlina Stoyanova /  Elena Wagner defeated  Barbara Schett /  Patty Schnyder 6–4, 6–2
 It was Stoyanova's only title of the year and the 1st of her career. It was Wagner's only title of the year and the 3rd of her career.

References

External links
 ITF tournament edition details
 Tournament draws

Internazionali Femminili di Palermo
Internazionali Femminili di Palermo
1998 in Italian women's sport
Torneo